Mehdiabad-e Olya (also Romanized as Mehdīābād-e ‘Olyā; also known as Mahdīābād-e ‘Olyā) is a village in Chahdegal Rural District, Negin Kavir District, Fahraj County, Kerman Province, Iran. At the 2006 census, its population was 298, in 65 families.

References 

Populated places in Fahraj County